The Great American Fourth of July and Other Disasters is an American made-for-television family-comedy film, directed by Richard Bartlett, with a script written by Jean Shepherd. Produced by Olvia Tappan, the film is the second installment in the Ralph Parker franchise. Based on Shepherd's book, In God We Trust: All Others Pay Cash and similar to all the other Parker Family movies, the film depicts fictionalized events from his real-life childhood.

Released exclusively as it aired on American Playhouse, season one, episode ten; the movie was met with moderately positive critical reception. In the years since, the film has been labeled as a 4th of July holiday movie classic film.

Synopsis
Set during the late-1940s to early-1950s America, high school-aged Ralph Parker prepares himself for the perceived date of his life, with his friend's attractive cousin named Pamela. While he plans the event with precision, his mother and father each respectively prepare to celebrate the nation's Independence Day. Mrs. Parker passes a chain letter around the neighborhood, while inheriting a large sum of wash rags. Mr. Parker decides to display his patriotism by lighting off Roman Candle fireworks from his pockets that night during the neighborhood event. Though Ralph believes he's prepared for the date, he ultimately embarrasses himself. Meanwhile, the parents come to terms with the neighbors' perceptions of their family.

Cast
 Matt Dillon as Ralph "Ralphie" Parker
 Jean Shepherd as Ralph Parker/the Narrator
 James Broderick as Mr. Parker
 Barbara Bolton as Mrs. Parker
 Jay Ine as Randy Parker
 William Lampley as Flick
 Jeffery Yonis as Schwartz
 Babe Sargent as Ludlow Kissel
 Lisa Jacobsen as Pamela

Release
The Great American Fourth of July and Other Disasters was released on March 16, 1982 during an episode of the anthological television series, American Playhouse.

Sequels
The movie was followed by a number of sequels, as a part of a larger franchise of films, an adaptation for stage, and a television broadcast adaptation of that play. The film's direct follow-up, albeit a prequel chronologically, A Christmas Story was released in 1983.

References

External links
 

1976 films
American comedy films
1980s English-language films
1970s English-language films
1970s American films
1980s American films